Umaru Rahman (born December 15, 1982 in Freetown, Sierra Leone) commonly known as Gallon Pan is a former Sierra Leonean international footballer, who was a striker and currently played for several clubs, but he is famously remembered  for playing for East End Lions.

Early life
Rahman was born 1982 in Freetown's suburbs of Fourah Bay to Oku parents.

Career
He started his football career in his native Sierra Leone with powerhouse East End Lions in the Sierra Leone National Premier League, where he was the team captain and one of the best players in the premier league. Rahman signed with top Vietnamese club, Bình Dương F.C. in 2005 and 2006 with LG-ACB Ha Noi.

International career
In 2001, Rahman made his senior international debut for Sierra Leone against Liberia in a 2002 FIFA World Cup qualifier played in Monrovia.

Playing Career
2000–06 East End Lions (Sierra Leone)
2006–07 Bình Dương F.C. (Vietnam)
2007–08 LG-ACB Ha Noi (Vietnam)

Personal life
Rahman composed a song called Manchester United Celebrate which celebrated Manchester United's Premier League championship 2007–08 season.

References

Living people
Sierra Leonean footballers
Oku people
1982 births
Sportspeople from Freetown
Sierra Leone international footballers
Sierra Leonean expatriate footballers
Expatriate footballers in Vietnam
Association football forwards